ICFAI University, Sikkim is located in  Gangtok  in Sikkim, India.

References

External links

Universities and colleges in Sikkim
Universities in Sikkim
2004 establishments in Sikkim
Buildings and structures in Gangtok
Educational institutions established in 2004
Private universities in India